The Utah–Idaho Intermountain League was an Independent baseball minor league baseball league that played in the 1900 season. As the name indicates, the four–team Utah–Idaho Intermountain League teams were based in Idaho and Utah. The Utah–Idaho Intermountain League played just the 1900 season before permanently folding.

History
The Utah–Idaho Intermountain League began minor league play as an Independent four–team league, with the Ogden Lobsters, Pocatello Indians, Rio Grande Rios, and Short Line Shorts as the charter members.

On April 25, 1900, the Utah–Idaho Intermountain League officially began play, with the schedule continuing until September 19, 1900. The Ogden Lobsters won the 1900 Utah-Idaho Intermountain League Championship, ending the season with a 32–13 regular season record, finishing 4.5 games ahead of the 2nd place Rio Grande Rios (23–20). They were followed by the Pocatello Indians (21–24) and Short Line Shorts (12–23) in the final standings. There were no playoffs.

The Utah–Idaho Intermountain League permanently folded after the 1900 season ended on September 19, 1900. In 1901, the Ogden franchise and a Salt Lake City franchise joined two new clubs in another four–team league known similarly as the Inter-Mountain League.

Utah–Idaho Intermountain League teams

League standings
1900 Utah–Idaho Intermountain League

References

Defunct minor baseball leagues in the United States
Baseball in Utah
Baseball in Idaho
Baseball leagues in Idaho
Baseball leagues in Utah
Sports leagues established in 1900
Sports leagues disestablished in 1900